Roger Touhy, Gangster is a 1944 American gangster film based on the life of Chicago mob figure Roger Touhy, directed by film noir specialist Robert Florey.

Parts of the film were shot at Stateville Correctional Center near Joliet, Illinois, where Touhy himself was serving time.  Although the story was fictionalized, Touhy successfully sued the studio for defamation of character.  After six years, he won a judgment of $15,000, although Fox was able to profitably distribute the film overseas without legal repercussions.

Cast 

 Preston Foster as Roger Touhy
 Victor McLaglen as Herman 'Owl' Banghart
 Lois Andrews as Daisy 
 Kent Taylor as Captain Steve Warren
 Anthony Quinn as George Carroll
 William Post Jr. as Joseph P. Sutton
 Harry Morgan as Thomas J. 'Smoke' Reardon
 Matt Briggs as Cameron
 Moroni Olsen as Riley
 Reed Hadley as FBI Agent 
 Trudy Marshall as Sutton's escort
 John Archer as FBI Agent 
 Frank Jenks as Bernard O'Connor
 George E. Stone as Icebox Hamilton
 Charles Lang as FBI Agent

References

External links

1944 films
Films directed by Robert Florey
20th Century Fox films
Biographical films about American gangsters
Films scored by Hugo Friedhofer
American crime films
1944 crime films
American biographical films
1940s biographical films
American black-and-white films
1940s American films
1940s English-language films